Pseudoperichaeta is a genus of flies in the family Tachinidae.

Species
Pseudoperichaeta indica Gardner, 1940
Pseudoperichaeta indistincta Gardner, 1940
Pseudoperichaeta laevis Villeneuve, 1932
Pseudoperichaeta leo (Curran, 1941)
Pseudoperichaeta madecassa Mesnil, 1939
Pseudoperichaeta monochaeta Mesnil, 1952
Pseudoperichaeta nestor (Curran, 1927)
Pseudoperichaeta nigrolineata (Walker, 1853)
Pseudoperichaeta pacta Villeneuve, 1932
Pseudoperichaeta palesioidea (Robineau-Desvoidy, 1830)
Pseudoperichaeta roseanella (Baranov, 1936)
Pseudoperichaeta sallax (Curran, 1927)

References

Diptera of Europe
Diptera of Asia
Diptera of Africa
Exoristinae
Tachinidae genera
Taxa named by Friedrich Moritz Brauer
Taxa named by Julius von Bergenstamm